Geinitz is a surname. Notable people with the surname include:

 Eugen Geinitz (1854–1925), German geologist and mineralogist, son of Hanns
 Hanns Bruno Geinitz (1814–1900), German geologist

German-language surnames